Luckett railway station served the hamlet of Luckett, Cornwall, England, from 1908 to 1966 on the Callington Branch.

History 

The station was opened as Stoke Climsland on 2 March 1908 by the Plymouth, Devonport and South Western Junction Railway. It was originally Monk's Corner Depot on the East Cornwall Mineral Railway but it changed to a station when the Plymouth, Devonport and South Western Junction Railway took over. Its name was changed to Luckett on 1 October 1909. The station master in 1914 was Mr Leonard Maker who was only 18 years old. It had a carriage shed which closed on 31 March 1923. The station handled parcels, live stock, cattle vans and horse boxes. It had four sidings which were known as Greenhill Siding, Clitter's Siding, Whiterocks Siding and Hingston Down Siding. The station closed to goods traffic on 10 September 1962. It became unstaffed on 7 March 1966 and closed to passengers 8 months later, on 7 November 1966.

References 

Disused railway stations in Cornwall
Railway stations in Great Britain opened in 1908
Railway stations in Great Britain closed in 1966
1908 establishments in England
1966 disestablishments in England
Beeching closures in England